Something Old, Something New is a studio album by Dizzy Gillespie, recorded and released in 1963.

Reception
The AllMusic review states "this was one of Dizzy Gillespie's finest sessions of the 1960s".

Track listing
 "Bebop" (Dizzy Gillespie) – 6:17
 "Good Bait" (Count Basie, Tadd Dameron) – 3:03
 Medley: "I Can't Get Started"/"'Round Midnight" (Vernon Duke, Ira Gershwin)/(Thelonious Monk, Bernie Hanighen, Cootie Williams) – 6:23
 "Dizzy Atmosphere" (Gillespie) – 6:12
 "November Afternoon" (Tom McIntosh) – 4:19
 "This Lovely Feeling" (Margo Guryan, Arif Mardin) – 4:19
 "The Day After" (McIntosh) – 4:33
 "Cup Bearers" (McIntosh) – 6:11
 "Early Mornin' Blues" (Gillespie) – 2:55 Bonus track on CD reissue

Personnel

Dizzy Gillespie – trumpet
James Moody – flute, alto saxophone, tenor saxophone
Kenny Barron – piano
Chris White – double bass
Rudy Collins – drums

References 

1963 albums
Dizzy Gillespie albums
Philips Records albums
Albums arranged by Lalo Schifrin